Nechayev or Nechaev is a Russian masculine surname, its feminine counterpart is Nechayeva or Nechaeva. It may refer to:

Aleksandr Nechayev (disambiguation), several people
Andrey Nechaev (born 1953), Russian politician, scientist and economist
Anna Nechaeva, Russian soprano singer
Konstantin Petrovich Nechaev (died 1946), Russian anti-communist general and mercenary
Leonid Nechayev (1939–2010), Russian children's film director
Oleg Nechayev (born 1971), Russian football coach and a former player 
Pyotr Nechayev (1842–1905), Russian religious writer and lecturer
Sergey Nechayev (1847–1882), Russian revolutionary
Stepan Nechayev (1792–1860), Russian historian
Victor Nechayev (born 1955), Russian ice hockey player 
Viktor Nechaev (born 1972), Russian rugby league player
Vladimir Nechaev (1908–1969), Soviet singer
Yaroslava Nechaeva, Russian ice dancer
Yelena Nechayeva (born 1979), Russian fencer
Yury Nechaev-Maltsov (1834–1913), Russian glassware manufacturer, landlord and patron of art

See also
Nechayev Sad, a village in southeastern Kazakhstan

Russian-language surnames